Warner Robins High School is a high school in Warner Robins, Georgia, United States. It was established in 1944 and enrolls approximately 1,690 students.

The mascot, the Demon, was originally adopted during World War II in honor of the 7th Fighter Squadron at Robins Air Force Base which earned the title "the Screamin' Demons" in the South Pacific.

Campus
The campus of WRHS is divided into four main buildings, the Main Building, Two Story, Multi-Purpose, and Vocational building. Beside the school is "Demon Valley," a football field where the WRHS Demons football team practices, as well as another field on the other side of Demon Valley Road where the Demon Marching  Band practices and the cross country team. The main campus is connected by a bridge that crosses over South Davis Drive to the school's parking lot, a school gym, and McConnell-Talbert Stadium, which holds nearly 8,000 fans

Extracurricular activities

Athletics
The following sports are offered at Warner Robins: baseball, basketball, cheerleading, cross country, flag football, football, golf, boys' and girls' soccer, softball, swimming, tennis, track, volleyball, and wrestling.

One-Act Play
Over the years, WRHS productions have participated in the GHSA One-Act Competition, the Georgia Theatre Conference, Georgia Thespian Conference, and the Southeastern Theatre Conference.

State Titles
Boys' Basketball - 2018(5A)
Girls' Basketball - 1965(3A)
Football - 1976(3A), 1981(4A), 1988(4A), 2004(4A), 2020(5A), 2021 (5A)
Boys' Golf - 1991(4A)
Slow Pitch Softball - 1986(4A), 1997(4A)
Boys' Track - 1986(4A)

Other GHSA State Titles
Literary - 1980(4A tie), 1993(4A)
One Act Play - 2020(5A), 2021(5A)

Notable alumni

 Eddie Anderson, football safety who played for the Seattle Seahawks and the Oakland Raiders
 Willie Blade, former NFL defensive tackle for the Dallas Cowboys
 James Brooks, former NFL running back for the San Diego Chargers, Cincinnati Bengals, Cleveland Browns, and Tampa Bay Buccaneers; played in four Pro Bowls
 Marquez Callaway, wide receiver for the New Orleans Saints
 George Collins, former professional football player for the St. Louis Cardinals
 Mark Johnson, former professional baseball player (Chicago White Sox, Oakland Athletics, Milwaukee Brewers, St. Louis Cardinals) and current manager of the Tennessee Smokies
 Amanda Kozak, Miss Georgia 2006, second runner-up in the Miss America pageant, Miss Georgia USA 2008, Georgia Teacher of the Year 2015
 Sonny Perdue, former Governor of Georgia and United States Secretary of Agriculture
 Kevin Porter, former professional football player for the Kansas City Chiefs and New York Jets and coach for the Arena Football League, Avila, Point and Fort Valley State
 Victoria Principal, actress
 Willie Reid, former wide receiver and KR/PR for the Pittsburgh Steelers; ACC championship MVP in 2005; MVP of the Orange Bowl in 2006 vs Penn State
 Mike Richardson, former professional football player for the New England Patriots, Kansas City Chiefs, and Indianapolis Colts
 Ron Simmons, former nose tackle at Florida State University, member College Football Hall of Fame, played two years for the Cleveland Browns, professional wrestler
 Ben Smith, #22 overall in the 1990 NFL Draft by the Philadelphia Eagles. Played DB for the Philadelphia Eagles, Denver Broncos, and the Arizona Cardinals
 Greg Tremble, former professional football player for the Dallas Cowboys and Philadelphia Eagles
 Byron Walker, former professional football player for the Seattle Seahawks

References

External links
 

Schools in Houston County, Georgia
Public high schools in Georgia (U.S. state)
Warner Robins, Georgia
1944 establishments in Georgia (U.S. state)
Educational institutions established in 1944